Enes Karakuş (born 3 January 2001) is a Turkish professional footballer who plays as a forward for 1461 Trabzon on loan from Süper Lig club İstanbul Başakşehir.

Professional career
Karakuş made his professional debut with İstanbul Başakşehir in a 2-0 Süper Lig loss to Hatayspor on 14 September 2020.

On 5 January 2023, Karakuş moved on loan to 1461 Trabzon.

References

External links
 
 

2001 births
People from Etimesgut
Living people
Turkish footballers
Turkey youth international footballers
Association football forwards
İstanbul Başakşehir F.K. players
Karacabey Belediyespor footballers
Kırklarelispor footballers
1461 Trabzon footballers
Süper Lig players
TFF Second League players